Friday Anderson Jumbe (born 4 April 1955) is a Malawian economist and politician who served in the government of Malawi as Minister of Finance and Economic Planning under President Bakili Muluzi, representing the United Democratic Front.

Early life and education

Jumbe studied economics and political science and obtained a bachelor's degree in 1977 from the University of Malawi, Chancellor college. He obtained a post graduate diploma in project planning and appraisal from University of Bradford in 1980. In 1985 he obtained a Masters of Science degree in Finance and banking for Development from Fianafrica in Milan, Italy. In 2013 he was pursuing his dissertation for a Doctoral degree in Finance from Exploits University, a  private institution of higher learning in Malawi. His PhD research work is on the Malawi economy and its performance under aid packages from donors and multilateral institutions.

Career
Jumbe worked as a projects analyst in  Malawi Development Corporation in 1977. He was  General manager of National Oil Industries for seven years, and Agricultural Marketing and Chief executive Officer  Development Corporation  for eight years. He headed boards of the Illovo Sugar Corporation, the  National Bank of Malawi, and Auction Holdings Ltd and Finance Corporation of Malawi. He also served on various boards of private companies between 1985 and 2002.

Jumbe was elected Member of Parliament for Chiradzulu Central Constituency. In 2002 he was appointed Minister of Finance and Economic Planning, and held the post until 2004.

In 2004, Jumbe was arrested in connection with his alleged mismanagement of Malawi's strategic reserve of maize.

In 2009, Jumbe was interim leader of the United Democratic Front.

In 2012, Jumbe became acting President of the United Democratic Front, but subsequently alleged that Bakili Muluzi had not given him access to the party's finances, that he had therefore had to run the party with his own funds, and that this had been a ploy with the goal of preparing Muluzi's son Atupele Muluzi to take power.

In 2013, he was the leader of the New Labor Party. Also that year he faced bankruptcy proceedings related to a refusal to pay legal fees.

In February 2014, Jumbe formally announced his intention to run for President of Malawi.

References

External links
Interview with Friday Jumbe
"Statement by His Excellency The Honourable Friday Jumbe, Minister of Finance and Economic Planning, Republic of Malawi at the International Conference on Financing for Development Monterrey, Mexico 22 March 2002

1955 births
Finance ministers of Malawi
Living people
Government ministers of Malawi
Members of the National Assembly (Malawi)
United Democratic Front (Malawi) politicians